Egor Efrosinin (born 4 May 1994) is a Russian Paralympic swimmer. He represented Russian Paralympic Committee athletes at the 2020 Summer Paralympics.

Career
Efrosinin represented the Russian Paralympic Committee athletes at the 2020 Summer Paralympics in the men's 100 metre breaststroke SB7 event and won a silver medal.

References

1994 births
Living people
People from Biysk
Medalists at the World Para Swimming Championships
Medalists at the World Para Swimming European Championships
Paralympic swimmers of Russia
Swimmers at the 2020 Summer Paralympics
Medalists at the 2020 Summer Paralympics
Paralympic medalists in swimming
Paralympic silver medalists for the Russian Paralympic Committee athletes
Russian male butterfly swimmers
Russian male breaststroke swimmers
S7-classified Paralympic swimmers
Sportspeople from Altai Krai
20th-century Russian people
21st-century Russian people